Yuichi Nakamura may refer to:

Yuichi Nakamura (actor) (born 1987), Japanese actor active from 2003 to 2011 and from 2014 to present
Yuichi Nakamura (voice actor) (born 1980), Japanese voice actor

See also
Yuichi Nakamaru, Japanese singer-songwriter and presenter